Kashkarovo (Qaşqar) is a rural locality (a selo) and the administrative centre of Kashkarovsky Selsoviet, Zilairsky District, Bashkortostan, Russia. The population was 416 as of 2010. There are 8 streets.

Geography 
Kashkarovo is located 30 km northeast of Zilair (the district's administrative centre) by road. Ishkuzhino is the nearest rural locality.

References 

Rural localities in Zilairsky District